Debbi Kostelyk (born April 8, 1961, in Edmonton, Alberta) is a paralympic athlete from Canada competing mainly in category 3 events.

Kostelyk competed in the 1984 Summer Paralympics in athletics, winning gold medals in the Women's 100 metres and 400 metres, as well as silver in the 200 metres. In the 1988 Summer Paralympics, she won silver in the 100 metres.

References

1961 births
Living people
Athletes (track and field) at the 1984 Summer Paralympics
Athletes (track and field) at the 1988 Summer Paralympics
Paralympic gold medalists for Canada
Paralympic silver medalists for Canada
Athletes from Edmonton
Medalists at the 1984 Summer Paralympics
Medalists at the 1988 Summer Paralympics
Paralympic medalists in athletics (track and field)
Paralympic track and field athletes of Canada
Canadian female wheelchair racers